"Culo" is the debut single by Cuban-American rapper Pitbull. The song was produced by rapper Lil Jon who is also a featured artist. It served as the lead single from Pitbull's debut album M.I.A.M.I. The song uses the Coolie Dance riddim, which gained prominence from Nina Sky's hit "Move Ya Body". "Culo" also samples Mr. Vegas' song "Pull Up", for which Pitbull and Lil Jon were sued by Mr. Vegas.

"Culo" peaked at number 32 on the US Billboard Hot 100, number 45 on the US Hot R&B/Hip-Hop Songs, and number 11 on the US Hot Rap Songs. The remix version features Lil Jon and Ivy Queen. The song was included on Billboards 12 Best Dancehall & Reggaeton Choruses of the 21st Century at number twelve.

Charts

References 

2004 debut singles
Pitbull (rapper) songs
Lil Jon songs
Song recordings produced by Lil Jon
Ivy Queen songs
Songs written by Pitbull (rapper)
Dancehall songs
2004 songs